Prins Tjiueza (born 12 March 2002) is a Namibian footballer who plays for Liria Prizren of the First Football League of Kosovo, and the Namibian national team.

Club career
Tjiueza began playing football at age 4. In 2014 he was named Sportsman of the Year for Immanuel Ruiters School following his performance in the 2014 COSSASA Games held in Zambia. He joined local club Blue Waters F.C. when he was 11 years old. When the team bought the league license for Flamingos F.C. and joined the Namibia Premier League in 2017, Tjiueza made his top-flight debut. Prior to his Premier League debut, he played for the Young United Academy and Spoilers FC of the First Division while with Blue Waters.

In 2019 Tjiueza had a successful trial with Sporting Kansas City of Major League Soccer. However, the deal fell through after multiple teams claimed to have rights to sign him. 

In April 2021 he went on trial with an unnamed Turkish club. He played in a training match for the club and assisted on a goal. A few months later, it was announced that he had received his Turkish residency permit and was finalizing a deal with Süper Lig club Alanyaspor.

In August 2022 Tjiueza joined KF Liria Prizren of the First Football League of Kosovo. Over his first five matches with the team he tallied three goals and an assist. He scored in a surprise victory over FC Drita, helping his team advance to the Round of 16 of the 2022–23 Kosovar Cup in November 2022.

International career
Tjiueza was spotted by national team coaches at the 2017 and 2018 Skorpion Zinc Tournament in which regional youth sides compete against each other. At the 2018 COSAFA Under-17 Championship Tjiueza was the tournament's top scorer with six goals as the team advanced to the semi-final before ultimately losing to Angola. Namibia defeated Mauritius in the third-Place match with Tjiueza scoring the team's opening goal. Tjiueza then took part in the 2020 COSAFA U-20 Cup which saw Namibia advance to the final before a narrow 0–1 defeat to Mozambique. The result qualified Namibia for the 2021 Africa U-20 Cup of Nations for the first time. In Namibia’s opening match of the tournament, Tjiueza was named Man of the Match for his performance against the Central African Republic.

Thanks to his performances in the prior youth championships, Tjiueza earned a call-ups to the senior team in January and March 2021. He made his senior international debut on 28 March 2021 in a 2021 Africa Cup of Nations qualification victory over Guinea. In June 2021 he was named to Namibia's provisional squad by head coach Bobby Samaria for the 2021 COSAFA Cup. He was named as the youngest player on the final roster the following month. In August 2021 Tjiueza was once again the youngest person called up to Namibia's provisional squad for 2022 FIFA World Cup qualification matches against Congo and Togo the following month because of his excellent play in the NPFL.

International career statistics

References

External links
National Football Teams profile
Global Sports Archive profile
Soccerway profile

2002 births
Namibian men's footballers
Namibia international footballers
Namibian expatriate footballers
Living people
Sportspeople from Walvis Bay
Association football forwards
Expatriate footballers in Kosovo
KF Liria players